The Elephant Riders is the third full-length album by the band Clutch, released April 14, 1998 on Columbia Records, the only album Clutch made for the label.

Recording and release 
It was produced by Jack Douglas (whose other credits include The Who, Aerosmith, Blue Öyster Cult, John Lennon, James Gang and Mountain). The band convened in a 100-year-old house in West Virginia which they lodged in while making the album. Several incidents the band members experienced during their residence there became inspirations for some of the songs, notably in "The Soapmakers" and "Wishbone". Bassist Dan Maines had set up a BMX track in the yard surrounding the house.

Background 
The original concept for the title track and what became the title for the album, according to the bonus multimedia pack which came bundled with the original CD pressings, was an alternate history  version of the Civil War in which airships were used for reconnaissance and the cavalry rode elephants rather than horses.
The album has some of the band's live staples on it and has a different musical angle from the previous work. There is some very noticeable trombone on some tracks, which is keeping with the band's preference to alter their previous musical 'style' somewhat each album. They have the Stoner Rock efforts that the previous album had started to create, but stay true to their original Post-Hardcore, Punk Rock & Hard Rock N Roll roots as well, and continues with some Funk metal undertones. It also contains some more mellow songs as well.

It is an album that has a hidden track (one of three different ones) on the end of the song "The Dragonfly", and quite a few unreleased songs from the era (that are heavily bootlegged). Each print of the album has a different hidden track but you cannot tell from the album cover itself which one it is. The Japanese version has all three as separate tracks.

As of 2015, The Elephant Riders is out-of-print by Columbia Records and when asked about a possible reissue in 2012, vocalist Neil Fallon stated it was unlikely any time soon, saying:

"...maybe in the distant future [it] will revert to us, just because the terms of the contract will expire, but that’s not on our to-do list, because trying to talk to Sony’s lawyers is like launching a spacecraft."

Commercial performance 
The Elephant Riders debuted at #104 on the Billboard 200,  the first time a Clutch album had charted on the main chart, staying on the chart for one week.

As of 2001, the album has sold 88,377 copies in the US.

Track listing
All songs written by Clutch. Published © 1998 Freon Justice Music, Inc. (ASCAP)

The last track, "The Dragonfly", runs to 12:01 on the album itself; this is because each copy of the album contains one hidden track, which is after a few minutes silence, though it is not known which song you will get by the album cover itself. This gives most versions a run time of 51:03, instead of 45:21 minutes without the extra track (as the song itself fades out at the 6:19 mark). The Japanese version of the album, however, contains all three bonus tracks, separate of the last song and gives an even longer run time of 57:01.

The tracks listed below are unofficial bootlegs recorded during the album's sessions. They appear on an unofficial compilation called "Clutch: Rarities and B-Sides", alongside early hard-to-come-by Clutch songs. Its cover is a 'Clutch Cavalry - Pro-Rock' label. It is a precursor to the Slow Hole to China: Rare and Unreleased album the band would later release in 2003 under their own label, though it didn't have all of the bootlegged tracks from this unofficial release.

Personnel
 Neil Fallon - vocals
 Tim Sult - guitar
 Dan Maines - bass
 Jean-Paul Gaster - drums
 Delfeayo Marsalis - trombone on "Crackerjack" & "Muchas Veces"

Production
 Produced by Jack Douglas
 Engineered & mixed by Jason Corsaro; except "Eight Times Over Miss October" which is mixed by Jack Joseph Puig
 Recorded at Electric Lady Studios and Manhattan Center Studios, New York City
 "Muchas Veces" & "Crackerjack" recorded by Larry Packer at Stonewall Studios, West Virginia
 Mixed at Avatar Studios, New York City, and Ocean Way Studios & Jack's Kingdom, Los Angeles
 Assistant engineers: Andy Salas, Kurt Garrison, Barbara Lipke, Jim Champagne
 Mastered by Howie Weinberg at Masterdisk, New York City
 Art direction: Sean Evans & Clutch
 Photography by Dan Winters

Chart positions

Album

References

1998 albums
Clutch (band) albums
Columbia Records albums
Albums produced by Jack Douglas (record producer)